The Scarlet Letter is a 1913 silent film that was based on the 1850 novel of the same title by Nathaniel Hawthorne. It was directed by David Miles and starred Linda Arvidson, Murdock MacQuarrie and Charles Perley.

Background information
This film was a remake of a 1908 and a 1911 film, this film would also be remade in 1917; which is the oldest film version of the novel to exist in a complete copy. The most known of all silent versions is the 1926 film from Metro-Goldwyn-Mayer starring Lillian Gish; at the time when she was under contract to them. This film is notable for being filmed in Kinemacolor; an early color film process of the time, but only one reel of this film survives making it unknown how long in length it actually could have been. Had the film been beyond 40 minutes in length it would have been an early color feature film.

References

External links

1913 films
1913 drama films
Silent American drama films
American black-and-white films
American silent short films
Films based on The Scarlet Letter
1910s American films